Sainte-Geneviève Sports is a French multi-sport club based in Sainte-Geneviève-des-Bois, Essonne. It was founded in 1936. The senior football team plays at the Stade Léo Lagrange, and competes in the Championnat National 2. The colours of the club are red and white.

Notable players

External links 
 
  Non official website

Football clubs in France
Association football clubs established in 1936
1936 establishments in France
Sport in Essonne
Football clubs in Île-de-France